Yuri Vladimirovich Lodygin (born 26 May 1990) is a Russian professional footballer who plays as a goalkeeper for Super League club Panathinaikos. Although he represented the Russia national team at senior level, he had previously represented Greece at youth level.

Club career
Born in Vladimir to a Russian father and a Pontic Greek mother, Lodygin has lived in Greece since 2000, playing for Skoda Xanthi, coming from the youth team. During the 2008–09 season, his performances with the Skoda Xanthi U21 team lead to his first professional contract with the first team, which he signed on 17 June 2009. He was then loaned at Eordaikos 2007 for the 2010–11 season, where he made 25 first team appearances. He later returned to Skoda Xanthi, where he made his first appearance in the last match of the season against Ergotelis; since the 2012–13 season, he has been a member of the starting line-up. He was a member of the Greek U21 Football Team.

Zenit Saint Petersburg
In June 2013, Lodygin moved to Russia, joining Zenit Saint Petersburg for a fee of €800,000.

Olympiacos
On 27 January 2019, he returned to Greece, joining Olympiacos on loan until the end of the 2018–19 season.

On 16 June 2019, general director of Zenit Aleksandr Medvedev announced that the club will not offer Lodygin a contract extension for 2019–20 season.

On 3 August 2019, he signed a two-year contract with the Turkish club Gazişehir Gaziantep. On 10 January 2020 he announced that he left Gazişehir Gaziantep.

On 18 February 2020, he signed with Russian Premier League club Arsenal Tula until the end of the 2019–20 season.

PAS Giannina
On 20 January 2021, Lodygin joined Super League Greece side PAS Giannina. On 27 January 2021 he made his debut against AEK Athens at the Olympic Stadium in Athens, winning 2–0. He also played against Panathinaikos, progressing into the semi-final of the Greek Cup. On 8 May 2021, he extended his contract with Ioannina for one additional year. During his time on PAS Giannina F.C., he managed to establish himself as the first choice keeper immediately after signing, replacing Lefteris Choutesiotis. Due to his winning mentality, character, leadership and great personality, Lodygin 

was one of the most important players for PAS Gianniih on the 2021-22 campaign. Moreover, his attitude and goalkeeping skills helped him gain many fans, making him very popular among the club's fanbase. He is regarded as a club legend, as the best goalkeeper, and one of the best players to ever play for PAS Giannina.

Panathinaikos
On 4 June 2022, he signed a two-year deal with Panathinaikos. On 15 December 2022 he made his debut with the new club against Volos in Greek Cup.

International career
Lodygin represented Greece internationally at youth level, obtaining three caps with the U21 side between 2010 and 2012. He was called up to the Greece senior squad in May 2013. He was called up again in August 2013, but he refused to report.

He was called up by Fabio Capello to the Russian squad for the first time on 4 October 2013 for the team's 2014 FIFA World Cup qualification matches against Luxembourg and Azerbaijan. He made his debut for Russia on 19 November 2013 in a friendly against South Korea.

On 2 June 2014, he was included in Russia's 2014 FIFA World Cup squad. Igor Akinfeev played in goal for all of their matches in a group stage exit. He was also included in Russia's Euro 2016 squad.

Career statistics

Club

International

Honours

Club
Zenit Saint Petersburg
 Russian Premier League: 2014–15, 2018–19
 Russian Cup: 2015–16
 Russian Super Cup: 2015, 2016

Olympiacos
 Super League Greece Runner-Up 2018–19

Individual
Super League Greece Goalkeeper of the Year: 2021–22
Super League Greece Team of the Year: 2021–22
 Most clean sheets in Super League Greece: 2021–22

References

External links

gazzetta.gr an article about Yuri Lodygin

Yuri Lodygin

1990 births
Living people
People from Vladimir, Russia
Citizens of Greece through descent
Xanthi F.C. players
Eordaikos 2007 F.C. players
FC Zenit Saint Petersburg players
Olympiacos F.C. players
Gaziantep F.K. footballers
FC Arsenal Tula players
PAS Giannina F.C. players
Panathinaikos F.C. players
Russian footballers
Russia international footballers
2014 FIFA World Cup players
UEFA Euro 2016 players
Greek footballers
Greece under-21 international footballers
Association football goalkeepers
Greek people of Russian descent
Russian people of Greek descent
Russian Premier League players
Super League Greece players
Gamma Ethniki players
Süper Lig players
Russian emigrants to Greece
Russian expatriate footballers
Russian expatriate sportspeople in Greece
Russian expatriate sportspeople in Turkey
Greek expatriate sportspeople in Turkey
Expatriate footballers in Greece
Expatriate footballers in Turkey
Sportspeople from Vladimir Oblast
Footballers from Drama, Greece